Aqkol is the name of several places in Kazakhstan:

 Aqkol, Almaty
 Aqkol, Aktobe
Aqkol, Atyrau